56th parallel may refer to:

56th parallel north, a circle of latitude in the Northern Hemisphere
56th parallel south, a circle of latitude in the Southern Hemisphere